HMS H4 was a British H-class submarine built by the Canadian Vickers Co., Montreal. She was laid down on 11 January 1915 and was commissioned on 5 June 1915. After her commissioning, HMS H4 and sister ships ,  and  crossed the Atlantic from St. John's, Newfoundland to Gibraltar  being escorted by the armed merchant cruiser . H4 sank the U-boat  in the Adriatic on 23 May 1918. She was sold on 30 November 1921 in Malta.

Design

H4 was fitted with a  Hotchkiss quick-firing gun (6-pounder) and four  torpedo tubes. Its torpedo tubes were fitted to the bows and the submarine was loaded with eight  torpedoes. It is a Holland 602 type submarine but was designed to meet Royal Navy specifications. Its complement was twenty-two crew members.

References

 

 

British H-class submarines
Ships built in Quebec
1915 ships
World War I submarines of the United Kingdom
Royal Navy ship names